The Australian Council of Trade Unions (ACTU), originally the Australasian Council of Trade Unions, is the largest peak body representing workers in Australia. It is a national trade union centre of 46 affiliated unions and eight trades and labour councils. The ACTU is a member of the International Trade Union Confederation.

The President of the ACTU is Michele O'Neil, who was elected on 28 July 2018. The current Secretary is Sally McManus.

Objectives
The objectives of the ACTU, found in its constitution, are:
 the socialisation of industry,
 the organisation of wage and salary earners in the Australian workforce (within the trade union movement),
 the utilisation of Australian resources to maintain full employment, establish equitable living standards which increase in line with output, and create opportunities for the development of talent.

Organisation
The ACTU holds a biennial congress that is attended by approximately 800 delegates from affiliated organisations. Between congresses the ACTU is governed by an executive of 60 members: the president, the two vice-presidents, the secretary, the assistant secretaries, Trades and Labour Council representatives from each capital city and elected delegates from affiliated unions.

Current campaigns
The ACTU's main current campaigns include the campaign to win paid pandemic leave for all workers in response to the COVID-19 pandemic, the For the workers campaign to oppose Commonwealth Government proposals to change Australian workplace laws, and the promotion of a Working from Home Charter.

Following the 2007 Australian federal election, the ACTU's primary focus was the campaign to restore workers rights under the banner of the Your Rights at Work campaign In addition to this campaign the ACTU is also running a number of other campaigns, including workplace health and safety, working with other unions on the Your Rights at Telstra campaign and supporting the Rights on Site campaign.

The ACTU has also launched a service by which workers can join their applicable union directly through the ACTU. This self-titled "one stop shop" for union membership is Australian Unions.

In 2008, the ACTU launched a campaign to make paid maternity leave a new national employment standard.

In 2011, the ACTU launched a campaign to address the spread of casual, contract and other forms of insecure work in Australian workplaces. Part of this involved an inquiry into insecure work.

In 2023, the ACTU  and other big unions including the Health Services Union, and the Australian Manufacturing Workers' Union began a campaign calling for a levy to be imposed on non-union workers after the union was able to raise wages through collective bargaining.

History

In Australia, agitation for One Big Union took place from 1911 from two different sectors: from the revolutionary Australian section of the IWW and from the pro-arbitration Australian Workers Union (AWU). At that time the AWU was the largest single Australian union. In 1918 after the collapse of the Australian IWW, a group of militant trade unions (which were opposed to the AWU) attempted to form One Big Union under the name Workers Industrial Union of Australia (WIUA). The hostility between the WIUA and the AWU prevented the formation of One Big Union in Australia. The ACTU was formed as the Australasian Council of Trade Unions in 1927 and was one of the earliest attempts by trade unions to apply the principles of One Big Union earlier explored by more radical syndicalist unions like the CNT or revolutionary industrial unions like the IWW. The ACTU has not achieved the ideals expressed for One Big Union: it remains a council organisation, but it does however represent the majority of Australian trade unions. At its formation in 1927 the ACTU was only seen as representing blue collar trades unions, and only managed to achieve the support of trades unions.

Attempts of Nationalist Stanley Bruce's federal government in 1927 to dismantle the Australian Industrial Relations Commission impelled Australian trade unions to form a national council. The ACTU's Australian trade union "peak body" precursors include state labour councils like the Victorian Trades Hall Council (originating in 1856 as the 'Melbourne Trades Hall Committee'), the Labor Council of New South Wales (originally formed in 1870 as the 'Sydney Trades and Labor Council') and the Inter-Colonial Trade Union Congress (formed in 1879).

From 1948 peak bodies of white collar associations existed, and from 1969 peak bodies of government employees. The white collar bodies were: the Council of Professional and Commercial Employees Association (1948), which became the Council of White Collar Associations (1954), which amalgamated with the Salaried Employees Consultative Council of New South Wales (1954) to become the Australian Council of Salaried and Professional Associations (ACSPA) in 1956. The government employee bodies were: the Council of Commonwealth Public Service Organisations (1969) which became the Council of Australian Government Employee Organisations (CAGEO) in 1975. The ACTU successfully integrated these bodies in 1981. After 1981 the ACTU was generally viewed by the Australian media and public as the organisation representing all workers' organisations.

The ACTU and Labour Councils have often united Australian working class opinion behind certain initiatives like the eight-hour day or compulsory arbitration. In the early 1980s this unifying impulse created the Prices and Incomes Accord. The ACTU retains a close relationship with the Australian Labor Party: former ACTU President Bob Hawke went on to become the leader of the ALP and then Prime Minister of Australia. Other former ACTU Presidents who went on to become members of Federal Parliament are: Simon Crean (president 1985-90), Martin Ferguson (1990–96), Jennie George (1996–99), and Ged Kearney (2010–18). The November 2007 election win by the Labor Party, saw the election of a number of union officials to the parliament (Commonwealth) including Bill Shorten (Australian Workers Union) and Greg Combet (former ACTU Secretary).

In the late 1980s and early 1990s the ACTU was influential in a move to forcibly amalgamate smaller unions into so called "super unions". The ACTU's plans envisaged 20 super unions organised on an industrial basis. While many amalgamations occurred in the late 1980s and early 1990s (in part under the influence of changed industrial law), there are still many unions, and union coverage is often organised by historical amalgamation, not by industry.

Past campaigns 
In the lead up to the 2007 federal election, the ACTU campaigned actively against the Howard Government's WorkChoices legislation, which included an advertising campaign and public rallies. This campaign was originally called "Your Rights at Work" but is now known as "Secure Jobs. Better Future" and was considered a success in making industrial relations an important election issue by both marketing companies and even Joe Hockey MP, the Federal Workplace Relations Minister, who said "This is the most sophisticated political plan that we have seen in Australia.". One of the rallies was called Fill the "G" , attended by 50,000 people at the Melbourne Cricket Ground and broadcast to other similar rallies throughout the country. A previous national rally had a reported attendance of 500,000 around Australia.

Leadership

Presidents

Secretaries

Affiliated trade and labour councils
Eight trade and labour councils are affiliated with the ACTU:

 Queensland Council of Unions
 SA Unions
 Unions ACT
 Labor Council of New South Wales (Unions NSW)

 Unions NT
 Unions Tasmania
 Unions WA
 Victorian Trades Hall Council

Current affiliated organisations

 Australasian Meat Industry Employees Union
 Australian and International Pilots Association
 Australian Education Union
 Australian Institute of Marine and Power Engineers
 Australian Licensed Aircraft Engineers Association
 Australian Manufacturing Workers Union
 Australian Maritime Officers Union
 Australian Nursing and Midwifery Federation
 Australian Salaried Medical Officers Federation
 Australian Services Union
 Australian Workers' Union
 Breweries & Bottleyards Employees Industrial Union of Workers WA

 Civil Air Operations Officers' Association of Australia
 Club Managers Association Australia
 Communications, Electrical and Plumbing Union of Australia
 Construction, Forestry, Maritime, Mining and Energy Union
 Community and Public Sector Union
 Electrical Trades Union of Australia
 Finance Sector Union
 Flight Attendants' Association of Australia
 Funeral and Allied Industries Union of NSW
 Health Services Union
 Independent Education Union of Australia
 Media, Entertainment and Arts Alliance

 National Tertiary Education Union
 Police Association of New South Wales
 Professional Footballers Australia
 Professionals Australia
 Australian Rail Tram and Bus Industry Union
 Shop, Distributive and Allied Employees Association
 Transport Workers Union of Australia
 Union of Christmas Island Workers
 United Firefighters Union of Australia
 United Workers Union
 Association for Virgin Australia Group Pilots (VIPA)

See also
 1998 Australian waterfront dispute
 Australian Industrial Relations Law Reform 2005
 Australian labour law
 Australian Workplace Agreement
 Employers' organization
 Enterprise Bargaining Agreement
 Fair Pay Commission
 Trades Hall
 Trade Practices Act
 Transport Workers Act 1928
 Unions ACT
 Victorian Trades Hall Council
 List of unregistered Australian unions
 Workplace Relations Act 1996

References

External links
 

1927 establishments in Australia
Bob Hawke
ICFTU Asia and Pacific Regional Organisation
National trade union centers of Australia
Trade Union Advisory Committee to the OECD
Trade unions established in 1927